An-Nur (alternately Al-Nur, An-Noor) may refer to:

An-Nur, the 24th sura of the Quran 
Ayat an-Nur, the 35th line of the sura An-Nur

Places

Mosques
An-Nur Kotaraya Mosque, Malaysia
Masjid Annur Islamic Center, Sacramento, California
Masjid-an-Noor, Newfoundland, Canada
Al Noor Mosque (Sharjah), Sharjah, United Arab Emirates

Other places
Al Noor City, a proposed twin cities project on a causeway linking Yemen and Djibouti
Al Noor Hospital, Abu Dhabi, United Arab Emirates
Al Noor Academy, Mansfield, Massachusetts, US
Al-Noor School, Brooklyn, New York City
Alnoori Muslim School, Sydney, NSW, Australia